Duncan G. Fowles (18 July 1893– c. 1969) was a rugby union player who represented Australia.

Fowles, a hooker, was born in Brisbane, Queensland and claimed a total of 7 international rugby caps for Australia.

References

                   

Australian rugby union players
Australia international rugby union players
1893 births
Year of death missing
Rugby union players from Brisbane
Rugby union hookers